An agricultural drone is an unmanned aerial vehicle used in agriculture operations, mostly in yield optimization and in monitoring crop growth and crop production. Agricultural drones provide information on crop growth stages, crop health, and soil variations. Multispectral sensors are used on agricultural drones to image electromagnetic radiation beyond the visible spectrum, including near-infrared and short-wave infrared.

Legality

As drones entered use in agriculture, the Federal Aviation Administration (FAA) encouraged farmers to use this new technology to monitor their fields. However, with the unexpected boom of agricultural drones, the FAA quickly retracted such encouragement, pending new rules and regulations. With incidents such as drones crashing into crop dusters, the FAA and the AFBF (American Farm Bureau Federation) began discussions to agree on regulations that would allow the beneficial use of such drones in a safe and efficient manner.  

In 2016, the FAA published rules for commercial drone operations. These rules require that commercial drone operators pass a knowledge exam, register their aircraft, and fly in accordance with published restrictions. While satisfied overall with the rules, the American Farm Bureau Federation would like small adjustments to some of the restrictions that have been implemented.

Many countries, such as Malaysia, Singapore and Australia, have implemented laws regarding the use of drones. Such laws are still nonexistent in many countries around the world, and 15 countries have outlawed all drone operations. The EU plans to implement a common set of drone regulations for all of its members.

Security and ethics
The use of agricultural drones has ethical and social implications. One benefit is that they are able to monitor and control the use of pesticides properly. This allows minimizing the environmental impact of pesticides. However, drones do not require permission to fly over another person's property at altitudes of under . They may have microphones and cameras attached, and the resulting concern for potential privacy violation has caused some opposition towards drones..One other improvement with using drones is the precision that they operate with. 

Other companies might start flying their drones in unregulated areas to survey their competition and the condition of their crops and agricultural yield.

Future use
There is a large capacity for growth in the area of agricultural drones. With technology constantly improving, imaging of the crops will need to improve as well. With the data that drones record from the crops the farmers are able to analyze their crops and make educated decisions on how to proceed given the accurate crop information. Software programs for analyzing and correcting crop production have the potential to grow in this market. Farmers will fly a drone over their crops, accurately identify an issue in a specific area, and take the necessary actions to correct the problem. This gives the farmer time to focus on the overall task of production instead of spending time surveying their crops. Additional uses include keeping track of livestock, surveying fences, and monitoring for plant pathogens.

Both the purchase and maintenance costs of modern drones make them too expensive for small farms in developing nations. Pilot programs in Tanzania are focusing on minimizing those costs, producing agricultural drones simple and rugged enough to be repaired locally.

A research team from Washington State University has developed an automated drone system that deters pests like crows or European starlings from feeding on grapes and other crops. The birds could be scared off by the drone's noise, but researchers also could include distress calls and predatory bird noises.

See also
 Aerial seeding
 Agricultural robot
 Environmental monitoring
 Mechanised agriculture
 Precision agriculture

References

External links

Bring in the drones: flying robots could be a valuable tool for crop surveillance. (n.d.) The Free Library. (2014). Retrieved Sep 18 2016 
Farmers and Ranchers Will Soar with Agricultural Drones. (2015, April 28). Farm & Ranch Guide. Retrieved September 16, 2016 

Hetterick, H., & Reese, M. (2013, May 1). Ohio Ag Net | Ohio's Country Journal. Retrieved September 16, 2016, from http://ocj.com/2013/05/drones-can-be-positive-and-negative-for-the-ag-industry/
Penhorwood, J. (2016, June 29). Ohio Ag Net | Ohio's Country Journal. Retrieved September 25, 2016, from http://ocj.com/2016/06/drones-in-agriculture-ready-for-takeoff-with-new-faa-rules/

Agricultural robotics
Agricultural revolutions
Agricultural technology
Emerging technologies
Unmanned aerial vehicles